John E. "Jack" Manning (December 20, 1853 – August 15, 1929) was an American Major League Baseball player. His career covered 12 seasons, eight teams, and three leagues. He was a primarily a right fielder who also played many games as a pitcher, and would play the infield positions on occasion as well.

On October 9, when his Philadelphia Quakers ballclub were visiting the Chicago White Stockings in Lakeshore Park, he hit three home runs in the same game, becoming the third player to do so.  The first occasions were done by Ned Williamson and Cap Anson. All three had their big game in that hitter-friendly park in 1884.

Manning died in Boston, Massachusetts, and was interred at New Calvary Cemetery in Boston.

See also
 List of Major League Baseball annual saves leaders
List of Major League Baseball player-managers

References

External links

1853 births
1929 deaths
19th-century baseball players
Baseball players from Massachusetts
Baltimore Canaries players
Baltimore Orioles (AA) players
Boston Blues players
Boston Red Stockings players
Boston Red Caps players
Capital City of Albany players
Cincinnati Reds (1876–1879) players
Cincinnati Reds (1876–1880) managers
Hartford Dark Blues players
Haverhill (minor league baseball) players
Major League Baseball pitchers
Major League Baseball player-managers
Major League Baseball right fielders
Philadelphia Phillies (minor league) players
Philadelphia Quakers players
Sportspeople from Braintree, Massachusetts
Rochester Hop Bitters players